Jarkko Wiss (born 17 April 1972) is a Finnish football coach and a former player.

Player career
As a player, he played in the position of defensive midfielder for TPV Tampere, FF Jaro, HJK and Tampere United in Finland, Molde, Lillestrøm and Moss in Norway, Stockport County in England as well as Hibernian in Scotland. He was known for his powerful shots with both feet and as a hard tackler.

He has also appeared over 40 times for the Finnish national team.

Coaching career
After retiring in 2007 at the age of 35, he worked both as a youth coach and as a sporting director for Tampere United between 2008 and 2009. He also managed the Finnish under-15 football team.

On 29 October 2010 it was announced that Wiss had succeeded the longtime head coach Ari Hjelm at Tampere United. He signed a two-year contract, with an option for a two-year extension, with the club on the same day. However, the club was banned from competition for the 2011 season.

Wiss is the new manager of Finland national under-18 football team since 1 January 2014.

On 6 November 2015 it was announced that Wiss is taking the head coach position at Ilves starting on 1 January 2016.

References

External links

1972 births
Living people
Footballers from Tampere
Finnish footballers
Finland international footballers
Association football midfielders
Helsingin Jalkapalloklubi players
Tampere United players
Moss FK players
Molde FK players
Lillestrøm SK players
Stockport County F.C. players
Hibernian F.C. players
Veikkausliiga players
Scottish Premier League players
Eliteserien players
Expatriate footballers in England
Expatriate footballers in Norway
Expatriate footballers in Scotland
Finnish expatriate sportspeople in Norway
Finnish expatriate footballers
Finnish football managers
Tampere United managers